Cuddebackville is a hamlet in the town of Deerpark, located in Orange County, New York, United States. Cuddebackville is home to Hamilton Bicentennial Elementary School which is run by the Port Jervis City School District. This hamlet is also home to D&H Canal Park and The Neversink River Unique Area. The hamlet was named after William Cuddeback, a general from The War of 1812 and a descendent of the Cuddeback family, one of the first families to settle in the area.

The Cuddebackville Dam was a dam that was located in Cuddebackville. This dam was built in the 1820s and expanded on in 1903. In October 2004, the dam was removed by the Army Corps of Engineers to help aquatic life in the area.

According to the Census Bureau, the center of population in New York is located within the hamlet of Cuddebackville.

Cuddebackville also is home to the global headquarters of the Falun Gong movement and the Shen Yun performance arts troupe.

References 

Hamlets in Orange County, New York
Center of population
Former dams